Edwin Max Eduard Jürgensen (24 May 1898 – 1 April 1947) was a German actor. He appeared in more than forty films from 1930 to 1944.

Filmography

References

External links 

1898 births
1947 deaths
German male film actors